Miracle Flight may refer to:

"Miracle Flight", the Australian title of the episode "Gimli Glider" from the Mayday TV series
, a track from Nana Mizuki's Alive & Kicking
A form of queue-jumping or cutting in line at airports

See also
Miracle of Flight, a 1974 British animated short film
Miracle of Flight (1935 film), a German drama film